(born May 30, 1969) is a Japanese film director, producer, and screenwriter.

Biography

Early life
Kitamura was born in Osaka Prefecture, Japan. He dropped out of high school at age 17 and relocated to Sydney, Australia, where he attended a school for visual arts. His first film as director was the short Exit, which he made as his graduation piece at age 19.

Career
After graduating, he returned to Japan to establish Napalm Films, his independent production studio. His featurettes Down to Hell and Heat after Dark were successful in film festivals, and he soon found his first mainstream success with the cult film Versus. The film launched the career of stars Tak Sakaguchi and Hideo Sakaki, and brought Kitamura international recognition when it was released on DVD outside Japan in 2004.

In 2002, Kitamura directed the short film The Messenger: Requiem for the Dead as part of the Jam Films project, as well as Alive. In 2003, he directed a feature film adaptation of the manga Azumi, and Sky High, a prequel to the popular Japanese television drama. He collaborated with director Yukihiko Tsutsumi in the Duel Project, in which the two challenged one another to produce the best dueling movie with minimal production time and budget, with Aragami being Kitamura's contribution. Also in 2003, Kitamura served as producer for the film Battlefield Baseball, the directorial debut of Versus co-writer Yūdai Yamaguchi. Kitamura directed 2004's Godzilla: Final Wars, the 28th installment in the renowned kaiju franchise. The film was the first of Kitamura's projects to hold its premiere in Hollywood. In 2006, Kitmura directed LoveDeath, before relocating to Los Angeles, California.

In 2003, he directed the in-game cutscenes for Metal Gear Solid: Twin Snakes, a remake of the iconic Metal Gear Solid for the Nintendo GameCube. Unlike previous titles in the series, The Twin Snakes was developed by Silicon Knights and produced by Konami. The game featured similar mechanics to Metal Gear Solid 2: Sons of Liberty due to having been made on the same engine. Kitamura's direction of the cutscenes was viewed as controversial, criticism leveled at its Matrix-like action tone and unrealistic stunts performed by the characters. Regardless, it went on to receive positive reviews from video game review sites.

In 2008, Kitamura made his American filmmaking debut with Midnight Meat Train based on Clive Barker's short horror story of the same name. The film (starring Bradley Cooper, Vinnie Jones, and Brooke Shields) was distributed by Lionsgate, and released directly to the secondary market on August 1, 2008. Despite receiving positive reviews from critics, the film was a box office failure. Kitamura's next directorial venture did not come until 2012 with No One Lives, starring Luke Evans and Adelaide Clemens. It was shown as part of the Midnight Madness portion of the 2012 Toronto International Film Festival, and received a limited theatrical release on May 10, 2013.

While promoting No One Lives, Kitamura announced that he was working on his "comeback" film in Japan, stating in an interview, "It’s a completely different role than what I’ve done before. It’s also not a bloody movie, not a horror movie. It’s a big action movie." In November, 2013, the project was revealed to be Lupin III, a modern adaptation of the iconic manga by Monkey Punch. The film was released in Japan on August 30, 2014.

Kitamura's 2017 thriller film, Downrange, was announced to premiere at Toronto International Film Festival in September 2017. The film follows a group of people on a road trip who are trapped on a country road by a sniper. In 2018, Kitamura directed a segment in the anthology horror film Nightmare Cinema.

Future projects
Kitamura is set to direct the slasher film Black Friday 3D, based on a screenplay by Joe Knetter. He is also attached to direct Marble  City, a revenge film written by Tom Sjolund, as well as Gun Monkeys, from a screenplay by Lee Goldberg based on the novel by Victor Gischler. In May 2013, Kitamura confirmed that he has written the script for Versus 2, and that Tak Sakaguchi would likely reprise his role from the original film. In September 2015, it was announced that Kitamura will direct the supernatural thriller Vessels for Ubiquity Studios, set to be filmed in early 2016.

Personal life
Kitamura speaks English fluently. His favorite Godzilla film is Godzilla vs. Mechagodzilla (1974), and his favourite kaiju is King Caesar. He has expressed admiration for fellow Japanese director Shunji Iwai, asserting that the film Swallowtail Butterfly is "the best Japanese movie ever made." He has stated that his "dream project" would be to direct an installment in the Mad Max film franchise.

Filmography

Films

Video games

Notes

References

External links
 Ryuhei Kitamura Official Site (available in Japanese and English)
 

1969 births
Horror film directors
Japanese film directors
Living people
People from Osaka Prefecture